Where Does it Hurt? is a 1972 American comedy film written and directed by Rod Amateau and starring Peter Sellers, Jo Ann Pflug, Rick Lenz, Pat Morita, and Harold Gould. The film is a darkly satirical look at capitalism in a hospital environment.

Plot
Sellers plays hospital administrator Albert T. Hopfnagel, who oversees a facility that is more interested in generating revenue than it is in providing sound medical care.

When construction worker Lester Hammond (Lenz) shows up needing nothing more than a chest X-ray, he is immediately admitted and subjected to a battery of tests. Hopfnagel rides the staff to perform more unnecessary surgeries and pad patient bills, while making time with multiple female staff members. When Hopfnagel finally ends up in jail for his devious deeds, he plots a revenge in which he will return to the hospital as a patient and be given an unnecessary operation that he can then sue the hospital over. But the plan backfires.

Cast
 Peter Sellers as Hopfnagel
 Jo Ann Pflug as Alice Gilligan
 Rick Lenz as Lester Hammond
 Harold Gould as Dr. Zerny
 Pat Morita as Nishimoto
 Kathleen Freeman as Mrs. Mazzini

Production
The film was announced in June 1971. Filming started in July 1971 in Los Angeles.

Reception
TV Guide describes the film by writing, “The language is profane, the proceedings inane, and the story insane…If you hate doctors, Mexicans, homosexuals, blacks, females, Catholics, Jews, Italians, Japanese, insurance companies, hospitals, Poles, and humanity, you'll love this movie.” Nonetheless, the film holds a 64% fresh rating, based on 144 reviews, on Rotten Tomatoes.

See also
 List of American films of 1972

References

External links

1972 films
1972 comedy films
Films directed by Rod Amateau
Films shot in Los Angeles
American comedy films
Films set in hospitals
1970s English-language films
1970s American films